Czudowice  (Chudovychi) is a village in the administrative district of Gmina Roźwienica, within Jarosław County, Subcarpathian Voivodeship, in south-eastern Poland.

References

Czudowice